Ili Turki is an endangered Turkic language spoken primarily in China. In 2007, it was reported that there were around 30 families using it in China.

Classification
Ili Turki appears to belong to the Chagatay group of Turkic languages, although it exhibits a number of features that suggest a Kipchak substratum.

A comparison of Ili Turki's Chagatay and Kipchak features is shown below:

Geographic distribution
Ili Turki is spoken in China's Ili Kazakh Autonomous Prefecture along the Ili River and its tributaries and in Yining. There may be some speakers in Kazakhstan. Ili Turki has no official status in either country.

Phonology

Consonants

Vowels

Vocabulary

See also
 Taranchi

Notes

References

External links

Agglutinative languages
Languages of China
Languages of Kazakhstan
Karluk languages
Endangered Turkic languages
Turkic languages